This is the discography of the Taiwan-based American R&B singer Wang Leehom. Wang has released sixteen Mandarin albums, two Japanese albums, three compilation albums, and fifteen Mandarin, Japanese, and Cantonese singles. He has contributed to over 10 movie soundtracks and collaborated on several other studio albums, including but not limited to the Asian editions of Tony Bennett's Duets: An American Classic and Kenny G's At Last... The Duets Album.   In addition to his own music, Leehom has composed, produced, and had lyrical credits for numerous other musical artists.

Studio albums

Mandarin

Japanese

Compilations

Live albums

Singles

Mandarin 
1996: "Nature" (大地的窗口)
1998: "Revolution" (公轉自轉)
2001: "The One and Only" (唯一)
2002: "Two People Do Not Equal Us" (兩個人不等于我們)
2004: "Miracle of Love" (愛の奇跡)
2004: "Dream Again"
2004: "Shangri-La" (心中的日月)
2005: "Finally" 
2005: "Mistakes in the Flower Field" (花田错)
2006: "As Time Goes by"
2007: "Falling Leaf Returns to Root" (落葉歸根)
2008: "What's Wrong with Rock?" (搖滾怎麼了)
2008: "One World One Dream" (2008 Olympics)
2009: "Man in the Mirror"
2009: "Open Happiness" (暢爽開懷)
2011: "Open Fire" (火力全開)
 2011: "Still in Love with You" (依然愛你)
 2012: "12 Zodiacs" (十二生肖)
 2014: "Lose Myself" (忘我) (feat. Avicii)

Cantonese 
 2000: "Take Your Time" (每天愛你廿四小時)
 2001: "Better Than You" (比你更好)

Japanese 
2003: "Last Night" (たった一人の君へ/ラスト・ナイト)
2003: "Miracle of Love" (愛の奇跡)
2004: "Dream Again"

Theme Songs 
2000: "China White" - China Strike Force (雷霆戰警) Hong Kong Movie
2000: "Light of My Life" - China Strike Force (雷霆戰警) Hong Kong Movie
2002: "The One I Love is You" (愛的就是你) - Peach Girl (蜜桃女孩) Taiwanese Drama
2002: "Like a Gunshot" - Spider-Man - Asian Ver. of Spider-Man OST
2002: "Beautiful New World" (美丽新世界)- CCTV New Year's Gala - Chinese TV Program
2005: "I'm Loving It" (我就是喜欢) - Mcdonald's Theme Song
2007: "Drama of the East" (戲出東方) - Fei Chang You Xi (非常有戲) Chinese TV Program
2008: "Stand Up" (站起来) - One Man Olympics (一个人的奥林匹克) Chinese Movie
2010: "All The Things You Never Knew" (不知道的事) - Love in Disguise (恋爱通告) Chinese Movie
2012: "12 Zodiacs" (十二生肖) - 12 Zodiacs (十二生肖) Chinese Movie
2013: "Love A Little" (愛一點 ) -  My Lucky Star 非常幸運 - Chinese Movie
2016: "Clash of Kings" (列王的紛爭) - Clash of Kings (列王的紛爭) - Game Theme Song
2016: "Bridge of Fate" (緣分一道橋) - The Great Wall (長城) - Chinese/US Movie
2017: "Listen Love" (聽愛 / 听爱) - Tofu (豆福傳) - Chinese Movie
2018: "Hero Goodbye" (再見英雄) - A Better Tomorrow (英雄本色) - Chinese Movie

Featured on Other Artist's Albums 
As a Singer
1999: Cass Pang - Passionate Love (好好愛)
Track 3 - "Let Me Feel the Warmth" (讓我取暖) 
2002: Candy Lo - A Taste of Life (賞味人間)
(Disc 2) Track 1 - "Better to be Apart" (好心分手)
2005: Kenny G - At Last...The Duets Album (Asian Edition)
(Bonus CD) Track 14 - "The One and Only" (唯一)
2006: Tony Bennett - Duets: An American Classic (Asian Edition)
Track 20 - "If I Ruled the World"
2016: Khalil Fong - Journey to the West (西遊記)
Track 2 - "Flow"
2017: Namewee - Crossover Asia (亞洲通車)
Track 2 - "Stranger In The North" (飄向北方)

Composition, Production, and/or Lyrical Credits
1999: A-mei -A-Mei's New Century (妹力新世紀)
(CD 1) Track 2 - "Love Will Never Disappear" (愛，永遠不會消失)
2002: Karen Mok -[i]
Track 4 - "Not Necessarily So' (那可不一定)
2003: Ailing Tai -Love's Foolishness (為愛做的傻事)
Track 7 - "Passion" (戴愛玲)
2003: Various Artists -Hand in Hand (手牵手)
Track 7 - "Hand in Hand" (手牵手)
2004: A-mei -Maybe Tomorrow (也許明天)
Track 2 - "Fire" (火)
2005: Fish Leong -Silkroad of Love (丝路)
Track 1 - "Silk Road" (絲路)
2005: Lim Jeong Hee -Music is my Life 
Track 11 - "Freedom" (자유) (自由)
2005: Jolin Tsai -J-Game 
Track 9 - "Exclusive Myth" (獨佔神話)
2006: SiEn 璽恩 -璽出望外
Track 3 - "I'll Love You Forever"
2006: Vivian Hsu -Vivi and...
Track 10 - "Because of You" (因為你)"
2007: Elva Hsiao -1087
Track 3 - "Honey Honey Honey"
2011: Selina Ren -Dream A New Dream(重作一个梦)
Track 3 - "Dream a New Dream (重作一个梦)"
2011: Jason Zhang -Closest Place to Heaven (最接近天堂的地方)
Track 2 - "First Lady(第一夫人)"
2016: Khalil Fong - Journey to the West (西遊記)
Track 2 - "Flow"
2016: TFBOYS - Jackson Yi (Jackson Yee)'s Single
Single - "You Say" (你说)

Soundtrack Contributions 
1998: The Mask Of Zorro 1998 Chinese OST 
Track 1 - I Want to Spend My Lifetime Loving You" (我用生命愛妳)
2000: China Strike Force Original Movie Soundtrack (雷霆戰警電影原聲帶)
Track 3 - China White
Track 11 - Light of My Life (Duet with Lara Fabian)
Track 12 - Don't Be Afraid (不要害怕)
2002: Music from and Inspired by Spider-Man (Asian Edition)
Track 20 - Like a Gunshot
2006: Life is a Game Original Soundtrack (愛情攻略原聲大碟)
Track 2 - Finally
Track 3 - Ai Qing Gong Lue (愛情攻略)
Track 4 - Wanting to Love (想愛)
Track 5 - Finally (Instrumental)
2008: 2008 Beijing Olympics
Beijing Welcomes You (北京欢迎你)
 Light the Passion, Share the Dream (点燃激情 传递梦想) [Torch Lightning Song]
 One World One Dream
 Stand Up (站起来)

Duets 

With Various Artists
"Welcome to Beijing" (北京欢迎你)
"A Date with the Future" (和未來有約)
"We Are the World"
"Hand in Hand" (手牵手)
"Because Love Is in the Heart" (愛因為在心中)
With David Tao, Daniel Chen, Nicholas Tse and Eason Chan
"Please Raise Your Head" (請你抬頭)
With Mavis Fan
"Snow Man" (雪人)
"Original World" (原來的世界)
With Mindy Orr
"I Want to Spend My Lifetime Loving You" (我用生命愛妳)
With TM Network, Tetsuya Komuro, Julio Iglesias Jr. and Sheila E
"Happiness x 3 Loneliness x 3"
With Cass Phang
"Let Me Feel the Warmth" (讓我取暖)
With Lara Fabian
"Light of My Life"
With William So
"Zuo You Wei Nan" (左右為難)
With Karen Mok
"That May Not Be" (那可不一定)
With Gackt
"December's Love Song" (12月のLove Song)
With Candy Lo
"Better to Be Apart" (好心分手)
With Kelly Chen
"True Colors"
"Walking on Sunshine"
With Kenny G
"The One and Only" (唯一)
With Rain and Lim Jeong Hee
"The Perfect Interaction" (完美的互動)
With Jin
"Heroes of Earth" (蓋世英雄)
With Nirace Ni
"Wanting to Love" (想愛)
With Tony Bennett
"If I Ruled the World"
With Selina Ren from S.H.E
"You Are a Song in My Heart" (你是我心內的一首歌)
With Jane Zhang
"Another Heaven" (另一個天堂)
With Avicii
"Lose Myself" (忘我)
With Weiwei Tan
"Bridge of Fate" (緣分一道橋)
With Zhang Ziyi
"Love a Little"(愛一點)
With Namewee
"Stranger In The North" (飄向北方)
With Khalil Fong
"Flow"
With Stephanie Sun
"Light the Passion, Share the Dream" (點燃激情 傳遞夢想)
With Jackie Chan, Han Hong, Stephanie Sun
"Stand up" (站起来)
With Yu Quan
"Beautiful New Word" (美丽新世界)
With Joey Yung, Sun Nan, Stephanie Sun
Let's Be Friends (相親相愛)

Others 
1996: Nature (大地的窗口)
Track 1 - "Nature"
2006: Sony Ericsson - Wei Ni Er Sheng (Limited Edition) 为你而声(限定盘)
Track 1 - "Mistakes in the Flower Field" (花田错) (Remix)
Track 2 - "Kiss Goodbye" (Instrumental)
2006: Sony Ericsson - Yin Yue Chuang Zuo Live CD (音樂創作 Live CD)
Track 1 - "Heroes of Earth" (蓋世英雄)
Track 2 - "Shangri-La" (心中的日月)
Track 3 - "A Simple Song" (一首簡單的歌)
Track 4 - "Julia"
Track 5 - "Impossible to Miss You" (不可能錯過你)
Track 6 - "The One and Only" (唯一)

References

Discographies of Taiwanese artists
Discographies of American artists
Mandopop discographies